Events in the year 1937 in Bolivia.

Incumbents
President: David Toro (until July 13), Germán Busch (starting July 13)

Events
 August – founding of Bolivian Socialist Falange in Santiago, Chile by Bolivian exiles
November 23 - founding of Workers' Party (Bolivia)

Births

Deaths

References

 
1930s in Bolivia